Giovinazzo is a town, comune (municipality) and former bishopric within the Metropolitan City of Bari, Apulia region, southeastern Italy.

History 
It was a small fortified centre of the Romans, who called it Natolium, maybe built on the ruins of the Peucete Netium which was destroyed during the Punic Wars.

After the Byzantine period, it became a countship (later a duchy). It became later a flourishing commercial centre, that had trading connections with Venice.

Main sights 
 The co-cathedral, dedicated to Santa Maria Assunta (Mary's Assumption), built in the Norman period (1150–1180), in characteristic Apulian Romanesque style featuring Eastern and Western elements, consecrated in 1283 under bishop Giovanni II; under bishop Paolo De Mercurio (1731–1752) it got a thorough Baroque remodeling.
 Ducal Palace/Castle (17th century)
 Two columns of the Via Traiana, which however did not pass through the city.

In the neighbourhood is Castel del Monte, one of the most famous castles in southern Italy, built during the 1240s by Frederick II Hohenstaufen.

People
 American actor John Turturro's father, Nicholas Turturro, emigrated to the United States from Giovinazzo in the first half of the 20th century.
 Raffaele Sollecito, falsely accused and incarcerated for the homicide of Meredith Kercher.
 Enzo Camporeale, pianist and composer

See also 
 List of Catholic dioceses in Italy

References

External links

 Official website 

Cities and towns in Apulia
Coastal towns in Apulia